Sul Ross State University (SRSU) is a public university in Alpine, Texas. The main campus is the primary institution of higher education serving the nineteen-county Big Bend region of far West Texas. Branch campuses, branded as Rio Grande College, are located in Del Rio, Uvalde, Eagle Pass, and Castroville.

Named for former Texas governor and Civil War Confederate general Lawrence Sullivan Ross, the institution was founded in 1917 as Sul Ross Normal College and was made a university in 1969. It is governed by the Board of Regents of the Texas State University System, which guides four universities and three community and technical colleges in the state.

History 

Named for Lawrence Sullivan Ross, governor of Texas from 1887 to 1891 and president of A&M College of Texas from 1891 to 1898, the institution was the successor to Alpine Summer Normal School.

April 14, 1914, Governor James E. Ferguson signed the bill selecting Alpine as the site for a normal school provided the residents of the town would provide land, water, and utilities for the college and housing for the students. This condition was met swiftly, and following a delay occasioned by World War I, the Legislature in 1919 appropriated $200,000 for buildings and equipment.

Construction proceeded, and under the presidency of Thomas J. Fletcher, Sul Ross State Normal College began operations in the present Dolph Briscoe Jr. Administration Building on June 14, 1920.

The first Sul Ross students
Seventy-seven students enrolled in the summer of 1920. They studied education and liberal arts subjects leading to teaching certificates and junior college diplomas. In 1923, the Legislature changed the name of the institution to Sul Ross State Teachers College, and advanced courses leading to baccalaureate degrees were added.  The first baccalaureate degree was awarded in the summer of 1925. In 1930, course work at the graduate level was initiated, and the first master's degrees were awarded in 1933.

Early in its history, Sul Ross became the cultural and educational center for the mountainous, remote Big Bend region. The state-supported Museum of the Big Bend was established in the 1930s as a depository for materials which depict the multicultural society and history of the Big Bend region, and in 1976, the Archives of the Big Bend in the Bryan Wildenthal Memorial Library was organized to provide a permanent depository and research facility for regional manuscript collections.

Under the leadership of President Horace W. Morelock from 1923 to 1945, the curriculum was expanded, additional academic buildings and dormitories were constructed, the college was admitted into membership in the Southern Association of Colleges and Secondary Schools, and enrollment increased to about 500 students. A decline in enrollment during World War II threatened the continued operation of the college, but was offset by the establishment of a successful U.S. Navy pilot training program and a Women's Army Corps Training School on campus, bringing more than 1,500 military trainees and officers to Sul Ross.

Postwar expansion
Following the war, the return of veterans increased the annual enrollments and prompted the expansion of the curriculum. Richard M. Hawkins became president in 1945, and the college was reorganized into divisions of Fine Arts, Language Arts, Science, Social Science, Teacher Education, and Vocations. Then in 1949, in recognition of the broadened mission of the institution to prepare students for a variety of careers and occupations, the name was changed to Sul Ross State College.

The enrollment grew to more than 1,000 in 1960 and to over 2,000 in 1970. During the presidencies of Bryan Wildenthal and Norman L. McNeil between 1952 and 1974, the academic programs continued to be strengthened; new fine arts, physical education, science and range animal science buildings and a new library were constructed, and several new degree programs were begun.

Sul Ross becomes a university
In 1969, the Legislature again changed the name of the institution, this time signifying full state university status as Sul Ross State University. The 1970s were years of stable or declining enrollments caused by the opening of several new colleges in West Texas. The general education requirements were revised; new degree programs were added in criminal justice, business administration, and geology; an off-campus study center was established on the campus of Southwest Texas Junior College in Uvalde to provide opportunities for residents of the Uvalde, Del Rio, and Eagle Pass areas to pursue upper-level and graduate work in teacher education and business administration; the Legislature appropriated more than $10 million to renovate and modernize the academic buildings; and personnel changes brought to the university a new generation of faculty, consisting, in 1985, of around 100 persons of whom 74% held a doctorate. By 1985, 10,925 bachelor's degrees and 4,862 master's degrees had been conferred.

Academics and research

Facilities and projects of interest

Archives of the Big Bend
 Borderlands Research Institute for Natural Resource Management
Center for Big Bend Studies
Chihuahuan Desert Research Institute
Chihuahuan Desert Resource, Conservation, and Development Area, Inc.
Museum of the Big Bend
Minority and Small Business Development Center
Bryan Wildenthal Memorial Library
Arts in West Texas
Rio Grande Heritage Tourism Project
Rio Grande Research Center
Sul Ross State University Alumni Association
Theatre of the Big Bend
Jim V. Richerson Invertebrate Collection
A. Michael Powell Herbarium
James F. Scuddy Vertebrate Collection

University memberships
American Association of State Colleges and Universities
American Library Association
Association of Texas Graduate Schools
Conference of Southern Graduate Schools
Hispanic Association of Colleges and Universities
National Association of Foreign Student Affairs
The Texas Library Association
National Collegiate Athletic Association
Texas Interscholastic Athletic Association

Sul Ross Law Enforcement Academy
The academy provides two types of training programs. A Basic Police Academy is conducted annually. Cadets who successfully complete the basic police training academy are eligible to sit for the Basic Peace Officer Examination. Those who pass this exam with a score of 70 percent or higher are then certified by The Texas Commission on Law Enforcement (TCOLE) and are eligible for hire by Texas law enforcement agencies.

The academy also provides continuing education and in-service training for law enforcement and corrections personnel in the Sul Ross State University service area. A variety of courses ranging from four hours to forty hours in length are offered each semester. These courses are designed to fulfill TCOLE mandated training requirements and to meet the unique training needs of area agencies of rural and small-town law enforcement agencies.

Student life

Athletics

Sul Ross State athletic teams are called the Lobos. The university is a member of the Division III level of the National Collegiate Athletic Association (NCAA), primarily competing as a founding member of the American Southwest Conference since the 1996–97 academic year.

Sul Ross State competes in 12 intercollegiate varsity sports: Men's sports include baseball, basketball, cross country, football, soccer and tennis; while women's sports include basketball, cross country, soccer, softball, tennis and volleyball.

Volleyball
In 1970 and 1971, the women's volleyball team won the first two Association for Intercollegiate Athletics for Women Volleyball National Championships.   The AIAW governed women's sports prior to NCAA recognition. Sul Ross State defeated UCLA and Long Beach State, respectively, in the championship matches. In addition, Sul Ross won Texas Intercollegiate Athletic Association Conference Championship in 1976, 1977, 1979, 1980, 1981, 1982, 1984, 1985, 1986, and 1991.

Football
 Independent, 1923–1927
 Texas Intercollegiate Athletic Association (TIAA), 1928–1929
 Independent, 1930
 TIAA, 1931–1932
 Independent, 1933–1935
 Alamo Conference, 1936–1939
Co-champion: 1936
 No teams fielded, 1940–1945 during World War II
 New Mexico Intercollegiate Conference, 1946–1949
Champions: 1947, 1948, and 1949
As a member of the NMIC, Sul Ross never lost a conference game including during its initial, probationary 1946 season when the team did not play a complete conference schedule and was ineligible for a league title.
1948 Tangerine Bowl Co-Champion (current Capital One Bowl) tying Murray State 21–21; the team was undefeated in regular season
 Lone Star Conference, 1950–1975
Champions: 1950 and 1965
1951 Aztec Bowl Champion defeating ONEFA All-Stars 41–40
1964 All-Sports Bowl Champion defeating East Central State 21–13
1965 NAIA Div. I playoff loss to Linfield College, 27–30
 TIAA, 1976–1995
Champion: 1982 (undefeated regular season)
Co-champions: 1981, 1983, and 1985
1982 NAIA Div. II playoff loss to William Jewell, 43–44
 American Southwest Conference, 1996–present
Co-champion: 1996

In 2007, it was announced that 59-year-old Mike Flynt would be joining the Sul Ross football team.  He had played college football when he was originally enrolled in college and his athletic eligibility had not expired..

In 2015, the team finished 3–7.

Baseball

 NAIA World Series Champion – 1957
 TIAA Champions- 1988, 1990, 1996
 ASC Champion – 1999

The Lobos home park, Kokernot Field, was the host for the first ever NAIA Baseball World Series. Texas Monthly called Kokernot Field the Yankee Stadium of Texas.

Men's basketball championships
 ASC Western Division – 2003, 2004, 2005, and 2018
 ASC Tournament – 2004
 NCAA D-III Sweet 16 – 2004

Women's basketball championships
 ASC – 1987, 1992 and 1995

Tennis championships
 Men's TIAA – 1980, 1981, 1982, 1983, 1985, and 1988
 Women's TIAA – 1980, 1981, 1982, 1983. 1985, 1988, and 1992

Track and field championships
 Men's LSC – 1971
 Frank Krhut – LSC Coach of the Year 1971
 Women's TIAA – 1980

Cross country
 Men – the Lobos best ASC Conference Meet finish was fifth place in 2008.
 Women – the Lady Lobos placed fifth at the ASC Conference Meet in 2004, 2005 and 2006.

Softball
Sul Ross began playing softball in 1996.

Women's Soccer
Sul Ross State University hired Marquis Muse in July 2015 as its first Head Women's Soccer Coach.  The Lobos finished 2–8 in conference play and 3–13 overall in its inaugural season.

Men's golf
Sul Ross captured the 1985 TIAA Golf Championship by 80 strokes.  1st Team All Conference\Medalist Blake Moody(Ozona, TX), 1st Team All Conference Daniel Nunez(Alpine, TX) and Kevin Farrer(Alpine, TX), 2nd Team All Conference Ronnie Martinez(Marfa, TX) and Kevin Burnett(Pecos, TX),  but has subsequently dropped the program.

Intercollegiate rodeo
Sul Ross was a founding member of the National Intercollegiate Rodeo Association and has a long and successful history with seven national titles, placing in the top 10 at the College National Finals Rodeo 33 times, and having six all-around cowboys and cowgirls.

 Men's NIRA Titles – 1949, 1959, 1951, 1962, 1982, and 1983
 Women's NIRA Title – 1985
 All-Around Cowboys – Harley May 1949 and 1950, Tex Martin 1953, and Cody Lambert 1982
 All-Around Cowgirls – Donna Jean Saul 1962

Notable athletes and coaches
 Paul Pierce (1914–2004) – He participated in football and basketball, and graduated in 1938 with his bachelor of science degree in chemistry. In 1946, Pierce was hired at his alma mater to rebuild a football program that was discontinued during WWII. He guided the Lobos to 18 consecutive wins, four conference championships, and two bowl games, including the 1949 Tangerine Bowl. He returned to Sul Ross in 1968 as a professor of health and education and chairman of the physical education department. Although better known for his football teams, he had an outstanding record at Sul Ross as the women's volleyball coach. From 1971–75, he directed them to the national tournament three times, won the national championship, and placed fifth in the nation twice.
 Norm Cash (1934–1986) – He was selected All-Lone Star Conference in football and baseball. He was drafted by the Chicago Bears as a running back in 1955, but declined to play pro football.  Cash was a first baseman who spent almost his entire career with the Detroit Tigers. An outstanding power hitter, his 377 career home runs were the fourth-most by an AL left-handed hitter when he retired, behind Babe Ruth, Ted Williams, and Lou Gehrig; his 373 home runs with the Tigers rank second in franchise history behind his teammate Al Kaline (399). He also led the AL in assists three times and fielding percentage twice; he ranked among the all-time leaders in assists (fourth, 1317) and double plays (10th, 1347) upon his retirement, and was fifth in AL history in games at first base (1943). Honors include: 1968 World Series Champion, five-time MLB All-Star, and 1961 AL batting champion.
 Gene Alford (1905–1975) (football) – QB Portsmith Spartans NFL 1931–33 and Cincinnati/St. Louis 1934
 Don Bingham (1929–1997) (football) – RB Chicago Bears 1956, BC Lions 1958
 Wilbur Huckle (born 1941) (baseball) – Infielder in the New York Mets minor league system from 1963 to 1971, and managed a Mets farm team from 1972 to 1974. Played baseball at Sul Ross State in 1961 and 1962.
 John Hatley (football) – OL/DL Chicago Bears 1953–1955 and Denver Broncos 1960
 Alfredo Avila (football) – DB Washington Redskins and San Antonio Toros, Little All-America in 1965 and 1966, set a national record with five interceptions in a 1965 game against East Texas State, claimed 36 career interceptions, still a school record
 Randall Carroll (born 1991) (football) – DB free agent contract with the Minnesota Vikings 2014
 Larry Jackson (basketball) – Ninth-round draft choice Atlanta Hawks 1970
 Scott Kubosh (baseball) – All-Conference shortstop 1999, ASC Western Division Player of the year 1999,   Pittsburgh Pirates organization with the Johnstown Johnnies of the Frontier League 1999–2000
 Dakota Dill (baseball) – Atlanta Braves organization with Danville Braves of the Appalachian League 2013
 Derrick Bernard (baseball and football) – New York Mets organization with the Port St. Lucie Mets of the Gulf Coast League
 Dominique Carson (football) – 2014 CPIFL Rookie of the Year, RB Dodge City Law, during his final season with the Lobos, Carson led all NCAA Division III players with 2368 all purpose yards. He tied the NCAA record for touchdowns in a game when he scored eight times in a 70–65 victory at Texas Lutheran.
 Mychal Pinson (basketball) – Soles de Mexicali in the Liga Nacional de Baloncesto Profesional Mexico.

Student housing
Student housing is located at Lobo Village. Lobo Village 1 (LV1) and Lobo Village 2 (LV2) are the permanent resident halls for students. Students under the age of 21 who have not lived on campus for four fall or spring semesters are required to live in these halls, unless they get exceptions from the Residential Living office. Fletcher Hall is a temporary overflow facility when all space at LV1 and LV2 is occupied. Students at Fletcher Hall are required to move to LV1 or LV2 when space becomes available in those areas.

Single students may live in the Lobo Village efficiency apartments in Lobo Village 3 and Lobo Village 4. To live in these apartments, students are required to be 21 or older. Family housing, for couples and students with dependent children, is located in Lobo Village 5, Lobo Village 6, and Lobo Village 7. Residents of the family housing are zoned to the Alpine Independent School District, and are zoned to Alpine Elementary School, Alpine Middle School, and Alpine High School.

Rio Grande College

Sul Ross State University (SRSU) operates Rio Grande College (RGC) and SRSU distance learning centers on the campuses of Southwest Texas Junior College (SWTJC) in Uvalde, Del Rio, and Eagle Pass. Serving thirteen counties in Southwest Texas, RGC offers both undergraduate and graduate programs.

The academic programs 
Rio Grande College offers college junior, senior and graduate level coursework with programs in liberal arts, business and teacher education and certification at the elementary or secondary level at all sites. To be admitted to Rio Grande College, a student must have completed 42 semester credit hours of transferable work, passed the Texas Academic Skills Program requirements, and met other admission requirements outlined in the current Rio Grande College Catalog.
 
Bachelor's degrees in a variety of fields including nursing, education, business, biology, criminal justice, English, Spanish, history, mathematics, psychology, social science as well as child development and organizational leadership are offered.

Master's degrees in English, history, public administration, business, education, criminal justice and health and human performance are also offered.

The RGC Distance Learning Centers at each of the four campuses provide real-time interaction between a professor and students learning from a distance. All campuses are equipped with two computer labs and writing centers, where students are tutored to master written and oral communication skills. Additionally, more than half of RGC's course offerings are available online for convenience of students otherwise obligated to work or family schedules.

History 
RGC was renamed by the Texas Legislature as Sul Ross State University Rio Grande College in 1995, recognizing its service to the broad area of the Middle Rio Grande and Wintergarden regions of Texas. Originally known as the SRSU Study Center, the college had been renamed the SRSU Uvalde Study Center in 1985 and again the SRSU Uvalde Center in 1989.

Cultural diversity 
The student body is multicultural and consists of traditional and non-traditional students.

Notable alumni
Don Bingham, American football player
Dan Blocker, played football at Sul Ross State, American actor, known for playing Hoss Cartwright in Bonanza
Norm Cash, Major League baseball player
Pete P. Gallego, former U.S. Representative for Texas's 23rd congressional district from 2013–15, Past President of Sul Ross
Sandra A. Gregory
Tuff Hedeman, retired 4 time World Champion Bull Rider
Erasto B. Mpemba, retired Tanzanian wildlife officer and, as a schoolboy, discoverer of the Mpemba effect, that under certain circumstances, liquids such as water and milk freeze faster when hot than when cool.
Roberta Rudnick, Professor of Geology at the University of California, Santa Barbara, member of the National Academy of Sciences, winner of the Dana Medal, and noted expert on the continental crust and lithosphere.
J.T. Rutherford, member, U.S. House
John F. Schaffer, Actor
Scotty Walden, head football coach at Austin Peay State University
Kern Wildenthal, graduated from Sul Ross in 1960, retired in 2008 after 22 years as president of UT Southwestern Medical Center. Past president of the Southwestern Medical Foundation, which promotes donations into UT Southwestern;  hospital and university administrator

References

External links 

 
 Official athletics website

 
Public universities and colleges in Texas
Educational institutions established in 1917
Universities and colleges accredited by the Southern Association of Colleges and Schools
Education in Brewster County, Texas
Buildings and structures in Brewster County, Texas
Tourist attractions in Brewster County, Texas
1917 establishments in Texas